The Auckland Northern Motorway (known locally as the Northern Motorway, and historically as the Auckland–Waiwera Motorway) in the Auckland Region of New Zealand  links Central Auckland and Puhoi in the former Rodney District via the Hibiscus Coast and North Shore. It is part of State Highway 1.

Until the end of the 1980s, it was largely associated with the Auckland Harbour Bridge as a connection between central Auckland and the North Shore, but since 1994 it has been extended to Puhoi to become the primary route between the Auckland urban area, the Hibiscus Coast satellite towns, the northern Rodney district, and Northland. Between the 1959 opening of the motorway and 1984, tolls were collected on the Auckland Harbour Bridge, and since 2009 tolls have been collected on the Northern Gateway Toll Road, the northernmost section of the motorway, bypassing the Hibiscus Coast.

The Northern Motorway sees heavy traffic, with around 170,000 vehicles crossing the Harbour Bridge each day (2019).

Route
The Northern Motorway starts near Puhoi, in the former Rodney District. It leaves the two-lane coastal road between Puhoi and Waiwera on the northern side of Johnstone's Hill, then tunnels under the hill in 340-metre long twin tunnels.

The initial 7 km section is an automated-toll road, also known as the Northern Gateway Toll Road. The electronic toll-registering gantry is at the southern end. At the first junction, west of Orewa, the motorway becomes toll free.

The next 17 km to Albany runs through a mainly rural environment. An interchange at Silverdale provides access to the Hibiscus Coast and the Whangaparaoa Peninsula, and access to the alternative toll-free route north via Urban Route 31 (formerly State Highway 17). The Orewa interchange can also be used, but requires driving through local residential areas. South of the junction at Dairy Flat is the motorway's only service centre, which serves northbound traffic, and is the toll cash-payment point for northbound traffic.

The motorway then descends steeply into the northern suburbs of the former North Shore City, the northern of Auckland's four former cities. Crawler lanes are provided for heavy vehicles between Oteha Valley Road and Greville Road. The Greville Road interchange was until 1999 the northern terminus, with the current northbound entrance and exit ramps following the old formation down to the roundabout intersection with Albany Highway.

The motorway proceeds south-east through the suburbs of the North Shore, with interchanges at Upper Harbour Highway, Tristram Avenue, Northcote Road and Esmonde Road allowing access to the suburbs. The Upper Harbour Highway interchange is the northern terminus of the Western Ring Route, which provides an alternative north–south motorway route around Auckland.

At Esmonde Road, the motorway turns south-west to follow the northern shore of the Waitematā Harbour to Northcote Point, where it crosses the Auckland Harbour Bridge. The bridge has a contraflow system on it which allows five lanes southbound and three northbound during morning rush hour, five lanes northbound and three southbound during evening rush hour, and four lanes each way at other times. The lanes are separated by a moveable median barrier.

Coming off the bridge, the road turns sharply to head eastwards towards the Auckland city centre. An interchange with Fanshawe Street allows access to the northern end of the city centre, and also allows lanes to be dropped ahead of the narrow four-lane Victoria Park Viaduct. The motorway then turns south-east across the Victoria Park Viaduct, and travels down the western side of the city centre, with an exit at Cook Street for the southern end of the city centre.

The motorway emerges at the top of the Central Motorway Junction ("Spaghetti Junction") and terminates at the Northwestern Motorway,  becoming the Southern Motorway.

Toll
Tolls for the Northern Gateway Toll Road are collected electronically, using an automated toll plaza just north of the Grand Drive interchange. The automated toll plaza uses automatic number-plate recognition to identify the vehicle: the number plate is optically read and details checked against the New Zealand Transport Agency's (NZTA) database, any pre-payment made or account open for that particular vehicle. Additional sensors detect the size of the vehicle, to help prevent misreads of registration plates and to notice plate swaps between cars and trucks. If the computer system needs assistance in recognising plates or for any other reason, data is sent to the NZTA office in Palmerston North for human analysis.

Each toll costed 78 cents to collect, as of May 2010.

History

The first section of the Northern Motorway opened on 30 May 1959, in conjunction with the opening of the Auckland Harbour Bridge. The motorway totalled 7.4 km, from Northcote Road to Fanshawe Street. On its opening day, 51,000 vehicles crossed the Harbour Bridge, with southbound traffic backing up for 10 km north of the toll plaza (near the present Stafford Road exit) with vehicles wishing to cross the bridge for the first time. Initially, the Auckland Harbour Bridge Authority owned and operated the motorway between Fanshawe Street and the toll plaza, while the National Roads Board (the predecessor to the New Zealand Transport Agency) operated the remainder of the motorway from the toll plaza to Northcote Road. During the motorway's construction and widening, large sections of Smiths Bush, a remnant kahikatea and taraire forest, were destroyed.

Access to the bridge was at first motorway limited, with all ramps facing towards the Harbour Bridge. Tolls for the bridge were collected manually, with cars initially paying 2/6 (two shillings and sixpence) to cross the bridge (equivalent to about $5.50 in 2017 dollars).

In 1962, the Victoria Park Viaduct opened, and the motorway was extended south from Fanshawe Street, over the viaduct, to Cook Street/Wellington Street. In 1969, the motorway was extended northwards from Northcote Road to Tristram Avenue, and the Auckland Harbour Bridge's clip-on lanes opened, widening the bridge from four lanes to eight lanes.

In 1978, the motorway was extended south to meet the Southern Motorway at Nelson Street/Hobson Street. This allowed motorway traffic a clear run from Tristram Avenue to St Stephens, on the northern side of the Bombay Hills.

In 1979, the Northern Motorway was extended northward to Sunset Road, near the present Upper Harbour Highway interchange. The motorway ended at a set of traffic lights on the top of a hill, giving limited visibility to motorway traffic. In 1984 a two-lane expressway opened, continuing from Sunset Road to Greville Road and on towards Albany Highway Albany Village. On 30 March 1984, the last tolls were collected for the Harbour Bridge, making the entire Northern Motorway free of charge from 31 March 1984.

In the 1980s, tidal flow was introduced on the Auckland Harbour Bridge to assist with peak flows on the Northern Motorway between the North Shore and central Auckland. The two central lanes were made reversible to allow a 5+3 split favouring the peak direction (southbound in the morning, northbound in the evening) during peak hours, and 4+4 off-peak. The lanes were controlled by overhead signals, which some motorists on the Motorway ignored and were killed when they collided head-on with oncoming traffic - between 1 January 1989 and 27 November 1989, some five people died as a result of collisions involving the so-called "suicide lanes". In 1990, a moveable barrier was installed to separate the traffic flows.

The expressway between Sunset Road and Greville Road was upgraded and became a part of the Northern Motorway in 1994. A new interchange was created at Upper Harbour Highway and Constellation Drive to replace the Sunset Road intersection.

The late 1990s saw the construction of the first stages of the Albany to Puhoi Realignment (ALPURT) – a 27 km extension of the Northern Motorway, bypassing Albany Hill and the Hibiscus Coast. The first section, ALPURT A, opened between Greville Road and Silverdale on 20 December 1999. At 13 km in length, it was the longest section of motorway to open at once in New Zealand. At the same time, ALPURT B1, a two-lane expressway between Silverdale and the back of Orewa opened.

In 2006, an upgrade to the Central Motorway Junction saw ramps open between the Northern Motorway and the Northwestern Motorway, and the Northern Motorway and Grafton Gully. Beforehand, traffic travelling from the Northern Motorway to the Northwestern Motorway or Grafton Gully had to exit at Cook Street and travel through local city streets to connect to West Auckland or the Port of Auckland.

ALPURT B2, the Northern Gateway Toll Road, opened on 25 January 2009 between Orewa and Puhoi. The Northern Gateway Toll Road was the first automated toll road in New Zealand, and the first under the authority of the NZ Transport Agency. At the same time, ALPURT B1 was upgraded to motorway standard to complete the Northern Motorway from central Auckland to Puhoi.

The Victoria Park Tunnel project was completed in early 2012 having been opened earlier in the year. Three northbound lanes were constructed in a cut-and-cover tunnel next to the existing four-lane viaduct. The viaduct, previously two lanes in each direction, was reconfigured to two pairs of southbound lanes; one pair accessing the Cook Street off-ramp and Port and Northwestern Motorway connections, the other connecting to the Southern Motorway.  In addition to the tunnel a movable median barrier on the northbound section between the tunnel and the Harbour Bridge allows five northbound lanes to be used in peak traffic times. The southbound section was also widened to five lanes, this being permanent.

Northern Busway
Although not technically part of the Northern Motorway, the Northern Busway is closely associated with the motorway. The first section of the 6.2 km bus rapid transit lanes opened in January 2008, and runs along the eastern side of the motorway between Constellation busway station (near the Constellation Drive interchange) and Akoranga busway station (near the Esmonde Road interchange). An additional 2.5 km southbound bus lane, opened in 2009, runs from Akoranga station to the Harbour Bridge approaches at the Onewa Road interchange. Dedicated ramps connect the busway with the Northern Motorway at Constellation Drive and at Albany busway station near the Oteha Valley Road interchange.

Future

Under construction

 Puhoi to Wellsford - A 34 km four-lane motorway or expressway from the current terminus of the Northern Motorway at Puhoi to north to Wellsford. One of the seven "Roads of National Significance" announced by the Government in March 2009. The contract for the section from Puhoi to Warkworth was awarded in November 2016 under a public-private partnership (the second for a state highway after the Transmission Gully Motorway) with a completion date set for 2022. The opening date was subsequently amended to 2023.
 SH1–SH18 Motorway Interchange - Currently the Upper Harbour Motorway (State Highway 18) and the Western Ring Route connect with the Northern Motorway at the Constellation Interchange. As a full diamond configuration interchange controlled by traffic lights, this is the only section of the Upper Harbour Motorway and the Western Ring Route, that is not to a motorway standard. The future interchange will include two-lane connections from the Upper Harbour Motorway and the Northern Motorway north of the interchange. The connections to and from the West to the Northern Motorway south of the interchange will continue to be controlled by traffic lights but will be considerably reconfigured from the existing layout.

Proposed

Several other major projects are proposed for the Northern Motorway in the future. From south to north they are:-

 Second Harbour Crossing - A second crossing over the Waitematā Harbour between the Esmonde Road interchange and the Central Motorway Junction is under investigation to supplement or completely replace the existing Auckland Harbour Bridge. The currently preferred alignment is from the Onewa Road interchange straight across the harbour to the Western Reclamation, then to the existing motorway near the Cook Street Interchange. The preferred crossing is quadruple tunnels, with two tunnels for general traffic and two for public transport, with pedestrians and cyclists using the existing bridge, but a bridge option in also under consideration. If the second crossing proceeds to construction stage, the project is estimated to cost up to NZ$4 billion. The National Government announced in 2013 for support for a tunnel across the harbour. Construction is estimated to begin between 2025 and 2030.
 Penlink - A planned link road between SH1 and the Whangaparaoa Peninsula. This road would connect with the Northern Motorway at a new interchange near Redvale. This road was originally planned as a toll road by the Rodney District Council. In 2008 the New Zealand Government announced that Penlink would be fully funded by a new regional fuel tax. However, in 2009 this decision was reversed, making the project currently uncertain.

Interchanges

 distance rounds down to 427 at the beginning of the Southern Motorway.

See also
List of motorways and expressways in New Zealand

References

Transport in Auckland
Motorways in New Zealand
State Highway 1 (New Zealand)